Cinobaňais a village and municipality in the Poltár District in the Banská Bystrica Region of Slovakia. It belongs to the largest municipalities in Poltár District, together with Málinec.

History
In historical records, the village was first mentioned in 1279 as a miner village (1276 Villa Suine, 1342 Schiuina, 1393 Zennabanya, 1460 Zwinyebanya). It belonged to Somoskő Castle. From 1554 to 1594 it was occupied by Turks.

Economy
Part of Cinobaňa municipality are also villages Katarínska Huta and Turičky and the settlements Hrnčiarky and Žihľava. 
In Katarínska Huta was in 1836 glasswork constructed, which was overtaken by Ján Kožuch in 1854. Ján Kožuch established here in 1847 a small steelwork, which was in 1854 overtaken by Kuchyňka family. Both factories still exist, but a part of the larger companies.
The village is popular for organising several sport festivals and events.

Genealogical resources

The records for genealogical research are available at the state archive "Statny Archiv in Banska Bystrica, Slovakia"

 Roman Catholic church records (births/marriages/deaths): 1776-1905 (parish B)
 Lutheran church records (births/marriages/deaths): 1769-1918 (parish A)

See also
 List of municipalities and towns in Slovakia

External links
 
 
Official homepage
http://www.e-obce.sk/obec/cinobana/cinobana.html
http://novohrad.sme.sk/lok/cinobana/
Surnames of living people in Cinobana

Villages and municipalities in Poltár District